Al-Sultana Khadeejah Sri Raadha Abaarana Mahaa Rehendhi (Dhivehi: އައްސުލްޠާނާ ޚަދީޖާ ސިރީ ރާދަ އަބާރަނަ މަހާރެހެންދި; died 1380) or more famously known as just Rehendhi Khadeejah (Dhivehi: ރެހެންދި ޚަދީޖާ) meaning, Queen Khadeejah, was the Sultana of the Maldives from 1347 to 1380. She was one of the few female rulers in the recorded history of Maldives.

Khadeeja was the eldest daughter of Omar I of the Maldives. After the death of her father Sultan Omar in 1341, his son Ahmed Shihabuddine ascended the throne as Ahmed Shihabuddine of the Maldives. Khadija had her brother, the Sultan Ahmed Shihabuddine assassinated and took the throne for herself in 1347, becoming the first female ruler of Theemuge Dynasty.

The army of the Sultana of Maldives consisted of a thousand men of foreign birth; some of them natives. They attend everyday to the hall of audience to salute her.

Biography

First reign
Khadijah was the eldest daughter of Sultan Omar I of the Maldives. According to Moroccan traveller Ibn Battuta, her Bengali grandfather, Sultan Salahuddin Salih al-Bangali, was the founder of the dynasty. She was also half-sister of Raadhafathi who succeeded her after her (Khadijah's) final reign. Her first accession to the throne was in 1347 after deposing her own brother, Sultan Ahmed Shihabuddine, which lasted until 1363.

Ibn Battuta: "One of the wonders of these islands is that its ruler (sultana) is a woman named Khadija ... . Sovereignty was exercised first by her grandfather, and then by her father. When the latter died her brother Shihab-ud-din became king. He was still young and the vezir 'Abdallah son of Muhammad al-Hazrami married the mother of Shihab-uddin and overpowered him. And it was he who married also this Sultana Khadija after the death of her husband, the vezir Jamal-uddin."  He then confirms the power struggles which resulted in the death of her brother and her enthronement: "The only survivors from the ruling house were his three sisters ... . The inhabitants of the Maldive islands preferred for sovereign Khadija and she was the wife of their orator (khatib) Jamal-ud-din who became vezir. He took over the reins of power . . . but orders were issued in the name of Khadija only. The orders were written on palm leaves with a bent piece of iron similar to a knife, while paper was not used except for writing the Qur'an and books of learning."

According to Ibn Battuta: 
"The orator (khatib) mentioned the queen (sultana) in the Friday prayer and also on other occasions. 'O my God!' says he, 'help Thy female slave whom Thou in Thy wisdom hast chosen from all creatures and made an instrument of Thy grace for all Muslims."

Ibn Battuta described that the women in the Maldives did not cover their bodies waist up as other Muslim women, neither did queen Khadija, and that his efforts to make them do so failed.

Second reign

In 1363 she was deposed by her vizier and husband Muhammad el-Jameel. However 1364 she came to the throne once more after deposing and assassinating her first husband. Her second reign lasted from 1364 to 1374 until she was deposed again, by her second husband and minister Abdullah I.

Third reign

In the third year after her deposition, she assassinated and deposed her second husband Abdullah I in 1376. Hence her third and final reign began in 1376 which lasted until 1380. Despite being deposed twice by her husbands she ruled the country for nearly 30 years. She was succeeded by Raadhafathi.

Legacy
Sultana Khadeeja is one of the most popular historical figures of the Maldives. The history of Maldives records the exploits of heroes such as Mohamed Thakurufaanu and Dhon Bandaarain, but the records of the few Queens that have been passed down through the generations are nothing more than a few lines recording their titles and genealogy. One of the few exceptions to this general trend has been the stories of Queen Khadeeja.

She was deposed twice, each time by her own husband, forcing her to stand up against him and quite possibly her own courtiers who conspired against her. She successfully deposed three Kings; her brother and two husbands. Despite successfully managing to assassinate three Kings, she managed to escape the same fate.

The stories of the Queen who killed her husbands who dared to take the throne from her has been spread among the Maldivians for generations. She became a symbol of female empowerment for some Maldivians. An underground feminist movement in the early 2000s named themselves "Rehendhi", after the Queen.

References

External links 
Women in Power 1300-1350

Succession 

1380 deaths
14th-century sultans of the Maldives
14th-century women rulers
Year of birth unknown
Islam and women
Maldivian women in politics